Javier Dione Carter (born May 20, 1991), nicknamed Air,  is a Panamanian professional basketball player for Passlab Yamagata Wyverns in Japan. Born in the United States, he has competed internationally with the Panama men's national basketball team.

High school career
Carter played high school basketball at Episcopal School of Dallas in Dallas, Texas.

College career
After high school, Carter played college basketball at University of South Alabama, with the South Alabama Jaguars, from 2009 to 2013.

College statistics

|-
| style="text-align:left;"| 2009–10
| style="text-align:left;"| South Alabama
| 32 ||17  ||15.4  || .473 || .000 || .732|| 3.50 ||0.22  || 0.44 || 0.97 || 4.19
|-
| style="text-align:left;"| 2010–11
| style="text-align:left;"| South Alabama
| 28 ||16 ||16.4  || .414 || .000 || .732|| 3.82 ||0.36  || 0.39 || 1.04 || 5.25
|-
| style="text-align:left;"| 2011–12
| style="text-align:left;"|South Alabama
| 27 ||20  ||23.6  || .457 || .000 || .765||5.04  ||0.67  || 0.74 || 2.67 || 6.11
|-
| style="text-align:left;"| 2012–13
| style="text-align:left;"| South Alabama
| 29 ||24  ||24.3  || .564 || .500 || .627|| 6.66 ||0.59  || 0.93 || 2.48 || 7.10
|-
|- class="sortbottom"
! style="text-align:center;" colspan=2|  Career

!117 ||77 || 19.6 ||.479  || .200 ||.710  || 4.70 ||0.44  || 0.62 ||1.74  || 5.57
|-

Professional career
On October 31, 2015, Carter was selected by the Bakersfield Jam in the fourth round of the 2015 NBA Development League Draft. His plays include the one-hand jam and the reverse alley-oop.

On September 21, 2018, Carter signed with Maccabi Kiryat Motzkin of the Israeli National League. In 32 games played for Kiryat Motzkin, he averaged 18.9 points, 9.0 rebounds, 1.6 assists and 1.2 blocks per game, while shooting 41.5 percent from three-point range. Carter led Kiryat Motzkin to the 2019 Israeli National League Semifinals, where they eventually were eliminated by Hapoel Galil Elyon.

Awards and honors
2013–14 LEB Plata MVP week by week
Latinbasket.com All-Chilean Liga Nacional Honorable Mention (2018)

Personal
He is a  son of Cecilio and Marcia Carter. His father is from Río Abajo, Panama. He is married (2019) to Kandace Carter.

Career statistics

Regular season 

|-
| align="left" |2013–14
| align="left" | Cáceres
| 32 || 19 || 20.7 || .583 || .395 || .738 || 5.56 ||0.47 || 0.56 || 0.94 ||  8.94
|-
| align="left" | 2014–15
| align="left" |Gravenchon
| ||  ||  || .585 || .434 ||  || 13.8 || ||  || 2.1 ||  18.7
|-
| align="left" | 2015–16
| align="left" | BAK
| 41 || 0   || 11.8 || .445 || .353 || .780 || 2.90 || 0.46 || 0.29 || 0.66 ||  3.71
|-
| align="left" | 2016
| align="left" | Panteras
| 1 ||    || 31.0 || .625 || .000 || .800 || 11.0 || 2.0 || 0.0 || 3.0 ||  14.0
|-
| align="left" | 2016–17
| align="left" | Soles/Cocle
| 19 || 7   || 17.5 || .589 || .000 || .667 || 4.74 || 1.21 || 0.84 || 0.47 ||  7.05
|-
| align="left" | 2016–17
| align="left" | Welcome
| 13 ||    || 28.7 || .526 || .333 || .718 || 8.4 || 1.2 || 0.8 || 1.2 ||  13.4
|-
| align="left" | 2017–18
| align="left" | Gallegos
| 30 || 28 || 26.7 || .542 || .412 || .722 || 8.00 || 1.00 || 0.70 || 1.07 || 12.57
|-
| align="left" | 2017–18
| align="left" | Valdivia
| 26 ||  || 34.3 || .523 || .176 || .703 || 9.5 || 1.4 || 0.8 || 1.4 || 15.5
|-
| align="left"  style="background-color:#afe6ba; border: 1px solid gray" | 2018–19†
| align="left" | Guaros
| 15 || 15 || 24.2 || .630 || .500 || .655 || 8.13 || 0.53 || 0.60 || 1.27 ||  10.07
|-
| align="left" | 2018–19
| align="left" | Kiryat
| 32 ||  || 29.4 || .528 || .415 || .727 || 9.0 || 1.6 || 0.8|| 1.4 ||  18.9
|-
| align="left" | 2019–20
| align="left" | Akita
| 22 || 21 || 27.9 || .424 || .333 || .729 || 8.1 || 1.9 || 1.5|| 0.9 ||  12.0
|-
| align="left" | 2020–21
| align="left" | Akita
| 48 || 30 || 26.1 || .436 || .335 || .689 || 6.3 || 1.6 || 1.0|| 0.9 ||  10.6
|-

Playoffs 

|-
|style="text-align:left;"|2013–14
|style="text-align:left;"|Cáceres
| 8 ||  || 24.3 || .481 || .412 || .800 || 7.8 || 0.4 || 0.6 || 1.1 || 11.1
|-
|style="text-align:left;"|2017–18
|style="text-align:left;"| Gallegos
| 4 ||  || 27.5 || .538 || .200 || .500 || 6.0 || 1.0 || 0.0 || 1.3 || 12.5
|-

FIBA Senior Team Events

|-
| align="left" |2017
| align="left" | Americas World Cup Qualifier
| 11 ||  || 26.39 || .567 || .500 || .741 || 6.3 ||1.5 || 0.7 || 0.6 ||  11.9
|-
| align="left" | 2017
| align="left" | FIBA AmeriCup
| 3 ||    || 31.03 || .533 || .667 || .600 || 8.3 || 2.0 || 1.0 || 1.0 ||  12.3
|-
|- class="sortbottom"
! style="text-align:center;" colspan=2|  Career

!14 || || 27.35 ||.558  || .524 ||.719  || 6.7 ||1.6 || 0.8 ||0.7  || 12.0
|-

Atlas challenge

|-
| align="left" |2016
| align="left" | USA
|  ||  ||  ||  ||  || ||8.3 || ||  || 1.5 ||  17
|-

Preseason games

|-
| align="left" |2019
| align="left" | Akita
| 3 || 2 || 21.6 || .833 ||.777  || 1.000||6.67 || 3.0|| 1.00 || 0.33 ||  13.0
|-

Source: UtsunomiyaToyamaSendai

References

External links

1991 births
Living people
Akita Northern Happinets players
American expatriate basketball people in Argentina
American expatriate basketball people in Chile
American expatriate basketball people in France
American expatriate basketball people in Israel
American expatriate basketball people in Japan
American expatriate basketball people in Mexico
American expatriate basketball people in Panama
American expatriate basketball people in Spain
American expatriate basketball people in Uruguay
American expatriate basketball people in Venezuela
American men's basketball players
Bakersfield Jam players
Basketball players from Cleveland
Cáceres Ciudad del Baloncesto players
Centers (basketball)
Maccabi Kiryat Motzkin basketball players
Nagasaki Velca players
Panamanian men's basketball players
Passlab Yamagata Wyverns players
Power forwards (basketball)
Soles de Mexicali players
South Alabama Jaguars men's basketball players